Chwalibogowo (German 1939-1945 Lobau)  is a village in the administrative district of Gmina Strzałkowo, within Słupca County, Greater Poland Voivodeship, in west-central Poland.

References

Villages in Słupca County